James Edward Caldwell (June 13, 1927 – October 9, 2013) was an American politician from the state of Connecticut. He served in the Connecticut State Senate from 1958 to 1974, and as Connecticut State Comptroller from 1974 to 1991, the longest term of any comptroller in the state's history.

Caldwell was a veteran of World War II and an alumnus of Fairfield University and the University of Connecticut Law School.

Named "Man of the Year" in 1967 by his alma mater, Fairfield University, he was a member of the St Charles Holy Name Society, the Ancient Order of Hibernians, the Knights of Columbus, the American Legion, and Fairfield Prep Latin Scholars. He was a founding members of the Fairfield University Glee Club and sang tenor in church choirs and barbershop quartets.

References

1927 births
2013 deaths
Politicians from Bridgeport, Connecticut
20th-century American politicians
University of Connecticut School of Law alumni
Fairfield University alumni
People from Stratford, Connecticut
Lawyers from Bridgeport, Connecticut
20th-century American lawyers